Euphydryas intermedia  is a small butterfly found in the Palearctic (Alps, Middle and South Ural, in the taiga zone and the West Siberian Lowland, South Siberia and the Russian Far East, Sakhalin, Mongolia, Northeast China, North Korea) that belongs to the browns family. It occurs up to 2200 m above sea level.

Description
Similar to Euphydryas maturna. The forewing length is 17–23 mm. The wing upperside ground colour varies from brick-red to light yellowish-orange. The hind wing postdiscal band contains minute black dots. The hind wing underside outer margin is fulvous.

Biology
The larva feeds on Veronica, Lonicera, Thalictrum and  Salicaceae. Flies from mid -June to late July.

Taxonomy
Synonym of Euphydryas ichnea (Boisduval, [1833]) 
E. i. ichnea South Siberia, Transbaikalia, Russian Far East, Amur, Ussuri
E. i. mongolica (Staudinger, 1892) Sayan
E. i. altaiana (Wnukowsky, 1929) Altai
E. i. konumensis (Matsumura, 1927) Sakhalin
E. i. wolfensbergeri (Frey, 1880) Alps (Maritime Alps)

See also
List of butterflies of Europe

References

Euphydryas